WHOT-FM (101.1 MHz, "Hot 101") is a commercial radio station in Youngstown, Ohio.  It airs a Top 40 (CHR) radio format. It is one of seven radio stations in the Youngstown market owned by Cumulus Media.  It carries syndicated shows from Adam Bomb on afternoons and Carson Daly on Sunday mornings.  The studios and transmitter are on Simon Road at Mayport Avenue in Boardman, using a Youngstown address.

History
In November 1959, the station signed on the air.  Its first call sign was WRED and it was the FM sister station to an AM station with the WHOT call letters.  The two stations were owned by Myron Jones.  From the late 1970s, FM 101.1 had an album rock format.  It called itself "The Wizzard" and used the call sign WSRD.

The connection between the WHOT call sign and the Top 40/CHR format is one of the longest running in modern radio history, dating back to 1955.  The AM version of WHOT was one of the first Top 40 stations in the country.  That station was a daytime-only signal licensed to Campbell, Ohio, on 1570 kHz (currently home to the Warren, Ohio-licensed WHTX). Despite its technical limitations, the station attained high ratings in the Youngstown radio market, which has lasted after several frequency moves... first to 1330 kHz in 1963 (now WGFT), then to 1390 kHz (now WNIO) in 1990.

By 1991, the AM and FM stations broke into separate programming with the 1390 kHz facility taking an adult standards format (one that would be revisited in 1999 when WNIO's call letters and format moved to that dial position), while the 101.1 MHz became the exclusive home of the Top 40 format. Excluding a period of several months when WHOT-FM carried an album rock format in late 1991-early 1992, the station has since continued playing Top 40 contemporary hits.

In August 1994, WHOT-FM and its AM counterpart, WBBW 1240 AM, were bought by Connoisseur Media for $5 million.  In 2000, the stations were acquired by Cumulus Media.

On August 15, 2006, WHOT became the first station in Eastern Ohio to broadcast in HD until it ceased HD transmission in 2015.

References

External links

HOT-FM
Contemporary hit radio stations in the United States
Cumulus Media radio stations